Madey Ridge is a ridge trending northwest from Mount Moffat along the north side of Berquist Ridge in the Neptune Range, Pensacola Mountains, Antarctica. It was mapped by the United States Geological Survey from surveys and U.S. Navy air photos, 1956–66, and was named by the Advisory Committee on Antarctic Names for Jules Madey of Clark, New Jersey, a ham radio operator who arranged innumerable phone patches between personnel in Antarctica and parties in the U.S. in the period 1957–67.

References

Ridges of Queen Elizabeth Land